Sha'ar Hashayamim Synagoge (Hebrew: שער השמים‎ ("Sha'ar Hashamayim", "Gerbang Surga" in Indonesian)) also known as Beth Knesset Sha'ar Hashamayim or Kahal Kadosh Sha'ar Hashamayim is an Orthodox Jewish Synagogue with Sephardi tradition (Spanish and Portuguese) located in Tondano, North Sulawesi, Indonesia, which was founded in 2003 and inaugurated in 2019.

Sha'ar Hashamayim Synagogue is the second synagogue in Indonesia after another synagogue in the city of Surabaya, which was built in 1939 by the Iraqi Jewish community, and abolished at 2013. Sha'ar Hashamayim is the only Orthodox Synagogue in Indonesia that is still operating today.

Gallery

See also 

 History of the Jews in Indonesia

References 

Buildings and structures in North Sulawesi
Jews and Judaism in Indonesia
Portuguese diaspora in Asia
Portuguese-Jewish diaspora
Sephardi Jewish culture in Asia
Spanish and Portuguese Jews
Spanish diaspora in Asia
Spanish-Jewish diaspora
Synagogues in Indonesia